

External links
Corporation of Chennai

Neighbourhoods in Chennai